International Magic Live at The O2 is the debut video album by English rock band Noel Gallagher's High Flying Birds. Released on 13 October 2012, the album documents the band's performance at The O2 Arena in London on 26 February 2012, as part of their High Flying Birds Tour. The footage was directed by Dick Carruthers, produced by Carruthers and Jeremy Azis, and features the full performance from the show as well as additional footage from the tour.

Track listing
All songs written and composed by Noel Gallagher. Tracks 2, 3, 12, 16, 20, and 23–26 originally performed by Oasis.

Intro – 1:19
"(It's Good) To Be Free" – 3:35
"Mucky Fingers" – 3:26
"Everybody's on the Run" – 5:11
"Dream On" – 4:10
Interlude 1 – 0:43
"If I Had a Gun..." – 4:02
"The Good Rebel" – 4:10
"The Death of You and Me" – 3:13
Interlude 2 – 0:33
"Freaky Teeth" – 4:33
"Supersonic" – 4:13
"(I Wanna Live in a Dream in My) Record Machine" – 4:44
Interlude 3 – 2:22
"AKA... What a Life!" – 5:59
"Talk Tonight" – 5:50
"Soldier Boys and Jesus Freaks" – 3:13
Interlude 4 – 1:22
"AKA... Broken Arrow" – 3:39
"Half the World Away" – 3:47
"(Stranded On) The Wrong Beach" – 4:16
Interlude 5 – 1:13
"Whatever" – 4:54
"Little by Little" – 5:36
"The Importance of Being Idle" – 4:20
"Don't Look Back in Anger" – 5:08
 Outro – 2:28

Additional content
In addition to the footage from the O2 Arena show, there is a second DVD which documents the band's show at the Virgin Mobile Mod Club in Toronto, Canada in November 2011, the Ride the Tiger music video trilogy, and the group's performance at the 2012 NME Awards.

Bonus DVD

Faster Than the Speed of Magic

Faster Than the Speed of Magic is bonus compilation album by Noel Gallagher's High Flying Birds included in the special editions of the International Magic Live at The O2 video album. It consists of thirteen demo recordings, including demos for ten tracks from the band's self-titled debut album, two B-sides and previously unreleased song "Freaky Teeth".

Track listing
All songs written and composed by Noel Gallagher.
"Everybody's on the Run" – 5:50
"Dream On" – 4:02
"If I Had a Gun..." – 4:10
"The Death of You and Me" – 3:28
"(I Wanna Live in a Dream in My) Record Machine" – 4:27
"Ride the Tiger  What a Life!" – 4:13
"Soldier Boys and Jesus Freaks" – 3:21
"Fallen Angel a.k.a. Broken Arrow" – 3:29
"(Stranded On) The Wrong Beach" – 3:33
"Stop the Clocks" – 4:58
"The Good Rebel" – 4:24
"I'd Pick You Every Time" – 1:50
"Freaky Teeth" – 4:01

Personnel

Noel Gallagher's High Flying Birds
Noel Gallagher – lead vocals, guitars, production (Faster Than the Speed of Magic)
Tim Smith – guitar, backing vocals
Russell Pritchard – bass, backing vocals
Mikey Rowe – keyboards
Jeremy Stacey – drums
Jack Birchwood – trumpet
Trevor Mires – trombone
Andy Kinsman – saxophone
Crouch End Festival Chorus – choir vocals
David Temple – choir vocal conduction

Additional personnel
Dick Carruthers – direction, production
Jeremy Azis – production
Ed Coleman – editing
Will Shapland – recording, mixing
Ian Cooper – mastering
Mazen Murad – mastering
Julian House – design
Lawrence Watson – photography
Mike Bruce – direction (Ride the Tiger)
Blake West – production (Ride the Tiger)

References

2012 video albums
Noel Gallagher's High Flying Birds albums
2012 EPs